David Holton (born 1946) is a British professor of Modern Greek at the University of Cambridge. He specialises in medieval and modern Greek language and literature, with special reference to the romance genre, early printing, Crete and Cyprus under Venetian rule, and the history and present structure of Greek. Since 2004, he has been working  with Geoffrey Horrocks, (professor of Comparative Philology and a Fellow of St John's College, Cambridge) and Panagiotis Toufexis (Research Associate) in the project of the world's first grammar of the vernacular Greek of the Middle Ages.

Works (selection)
 (with Peter Mackridge and Irene Philippaki-Warburton) Greek: a comprehensive grammar. 2nd edition. Revised by Vassilios Spyropoulos (London: Routledge 2012).
 "The first Modern Greek printed book: Apokopos (1509)", The Anglo-Hellenic Review 42 (Autumn 2010) 16-19
 David Holton, Tina Lendari, Ulrich Moennig, Peter Vejleskov (eds.): Copyists, Collectors, Redactors and Editors: Manuscripts and Editions of Late Byzantine and Early Modern Greek Literature. Papers given at a Conference held at the Danish Institute at Athens, 23–26 May 2002, in honour of Hans Eideneier and Arnold van Gemert. Herakleion: Πανεπιστημιακές Εκδόσεις Κρήτης, Herakleion 2005, S. 251–273.
 "Modern Greek: towards a standard language or a new diglossia?", in: M.C. Jones and E. Esch (eds.), Language change: the interplay of internal, external and extra-linguistic factors (Berlin - New York: Mouton de Gruyter 2002), pp. 169–79. 
 Διήγησις του Αλεξάνδρου. The Tale of Alexander. The Rhymed Version. Critical edition with introduction and commentary. Morfotiko Idryma Ethnikis Trapezis, Athens 2002.
 Μελέτες για τον Ερωτόκριτο και άλλα νεοελληνικά κείμενα,  Kastaniotis, Athens 2001. (Studies on Erotokritos and other modern Greek texts)
 (ed.) Literature and society in Renaissance Crete. Cambridge University Press, 1991, 
 (with Peter Mackridge, Irene Philippaki-Warburton): Greek. A comprehensive grammar of the modern language. Routledge, London 1997. : Patakis, Athens 1999
 (with Peter Mackridge, Irene Philippaki-Warburton): Greek. An essential grammar of the modern language. Routledge, London 2004. Greek translation: Patakis, Athens 2007.
 Classical Antiquity and Cretan Renaissance Poetry. In: Journal of the Hellenic Diaspora, 27.1-2, 2001, S. 87–101, brynmawr.edu (PDF)

References

External links
 Personal page,  Modern & Medieval Languages, Modern Greek Section, University of Cambridge 
 Personal page, Faculty of Modern & Medieval Languages, University of Cambridge 
 Publications, Modern & Medieval Languages, Modern Greek Section, University of Cambridge
 Damian Mac Con Uladh: A neo-Hellenist philhellene. In: Athens News, 20. Juli 2009

Scholars of Medieval Greek
Fellows of Selwyn College, Cambridge
1946 births
Living people